ACOP may stand for:
A Change of Pace, a pop punk band from Peoria, Arizona
Apostolic Church of Pentecost, a Pentecostal denomination